The Fall of Melnibone is an EP released by Spanish power metal band Dark Moor in 2001 through Arise Records. This limited edition EP contains bonus tracks that were previously released only in Japan and Korea.

Track listing
"The Fall of Melnibone" - 10:31
"Silver Lake"  - 5:18
"Wood's Song" - 3:09
"Halloween" (Helloween cover) - 13:24
"Cuentos de Ayer y de Hoy" (Ñu cover) - 3:41

Credits
Elisa Martin - Vocals
Enrik Garcia - Guitar
Albert Maroto - Guitar
Anan Kaddouri - Bass
Roberto Peña De Camus - Keyboards
Jorge Saez - Drums

References

2001 EPs
Dark Moor albums